is a passenger railway station located in Minami-ku of the city of Okayama, Okayama Prefecture, Japan. It is operated by the West Japan Railway Company (JR West).

Lines

Station layout
The station consists of a two opposed ground-level side platforms, connected by a footbridge. The station is unattended.

Platforms

History
Bizen-Nishiichi Station was opened on 1 January 1939. The station was closed from 1 Novemeber 1940 to 14 November 1950. On 25 September 1968, the station was relocated 250 meters in the direction of Uno Station. With the privatization of Japanese National Railways (JNR) on 1 April 1987, the station came under the control of JR West.

Passenger statistics
In fiscal 2019, the station was used by an average of 1813 passengers daily

Surrounding area
Okayama Municipal Houmei Elementary School
Japan National Route 2

See also
List of railway stations in Japan

References

External links

 JR West Station Official Site

Railway stations in Okayama
Uno Line
Railway stations in Japan opened in 1939